Cat culture describes the culture that surrounds cat lovers.  Cat fancy is a hobby involving the appreciation, promotion, or breeding of cats.  For some, cats can become an obsession.  Some refer to themselves as "cat people".

Description
One aspect of cat culture is to wear clothing that identifies the wearer as a cat person. Some of them have a type of language. Some of the "cat puns" they use are meowvalous which means "marvelous", Caturday which means Saturday and pawsome which means awesome. Cat terms such as "Purrfect" have been used in article titles such as CBS Sacramento's article about two cats living alone in a Silicon Valley studio, "Purrfect Tenants: 2 Cats Live Alone In A Silicon Valley Studio For $1,500/Mo." The culture has transferred to the internet, where it now flourishes. According to a 2013 article by Psychology Today, self-identified cat people have more unusual and distinctive personality traits than dog people. The article also speculates that due to the nature of cats and their sensitive nature, some people of a similar nature would feel an affinity with cats: thus, cat people would be more sensitive than dog people.  

In Morocco, cats are so much a part of everyday life that they are found everywhere. An article by Morocco World News said that people visiting there could think that the Moroccan person to cat ratio is pretty close to 1:1. Many Moroccans are said to love cats, and around the city there are piles of food and water trays left for the cats. A film by Tim Delmastro about cat culture in Japan features Chris Broad, a British YouTube personality. Broad made his way across the country where he documented the numerous strange and interesting cat-centric activities, including cat bars, cat temples, cat islands and cat cafes.

In action
Countries around the world celebrate cat festivals. Singapore has many cat lovers, cat cafes and a cat museum. It had its first cat festival in 2018. In Pasadena, California, there is a cat festival called CatCon Worldwide. In 2018, the POP Cats Convention in Austin, Texas was held. Websites for cat lovers include The Catnip Times,Vanggy and The Purrington Post.

According to the article "'Mysterious power over humanity': How cats affect health" by Alice Robb, there is a cat culture that flourishes online. There is a cat-themed cruise where cat lovers can meet people of the same type and have cat parties. There is a game called Cat-Opoly which is based on the board game Monopoly. With this game, cat lovers can buy cats instead of properties.

See also

References

cats in popular culture